The Merseyside Police and Crime Commissioner is the police and crime commissioner, an elected official tasked with setting out the way crime is tackled by Merseyside Police in the English County of Merseyside. The post was created in November 2012, following an election held on 15 November 2012, and replaced the Merseyside Police Authority. The current incumbent is Emily Spurrell, who was elected on 6 May 2021 and sworn into office on 13 May 2021. Commissioner Spurrell succeeded the inaugural holder, Jane Kennedy.

The Police and Crime Commissioner is required to produce a strategic Police and Crime Plan, setting out the priorities for the Merseyside Police, and their work is scrutinised by the Merseyside Police and Crime Panel, composed of elected councillors from the five local authorities of Merseyside.

List of Merseyside Police and Crime Commissioners

Powers and functions
The powers and functions of the Merseyside Police and Crime Commissioner are derived from the Police Reform and Social Responsibility Act 2011, replacing those of the Merseyside Police Authority. The main functions are to:

secure an efficient and effective police force for Merseyside
appoint the chief constable of Merseyside Police and, if necessary, dismiss them
set the police and crime objectives for Merseyside through a Police and Crime Plan
set the annual budget and precept level
contribute to the national and international policing capabilities set out by the Home Secretary; and
bring together community safety and criminal justice partners, to make sure local priorities are joined up

Election Results

References

External links
Office of the Merseyside Police & Crime Commissioner official site

Police and crime commissioners in England